Austin Andrews (born 1985) is a Canadian film editor who won an Emmy Award for Outstanding Multiple Camera Editing for a Drama or Daytime Fiction Program at the 48th Daytime Emmy Awards for his work on the television series Julie and the Phantoms.

Filmography

Awards and nominations 
 2021 48th Daytime Emmy Awards Award for Outstanding Multiple Camera Editing for a Drama or Daytime Fiction Program - Julie and the Phantoms - Winner
 2017 Leo Awards Award for Best Picture Editing (Feature Length Documentary) - Keepers of the Magic - Nominee
 2015 Leo Awards Award for Best Picture Editing (Television Movie) - Perfect High - Nominee
 2014 Argentine Academy of Cinematography Arts and Sciences Award for Best Film Editing - The Games Maker - Nominee

References

External links 
 

1985 births
Canadian film editors
Living people